Park Junyoung (born 12 March 1982) is a South Korean singer from Busan who debuted in Japan in March 2012 with the single .

Career
Park was a member of two different K-pop bands in South Korea, but they both disbanded.

He was subsequently spotted by Japanese enka singer  while performing as an independent musician in western Japan. His Japanese debut single, was released on 7 March 2012 on the King Records label, and reached number 109 on the Oricon music chart.

Park's second Japanese single, was released on 13 March 2013, and reached number 44 on the  Oricon music chart. On the same day, Park embarked on a tour of all 47 prefectures of Japan to promote the single.

Discography

Singles
 , (7 March 2012)
 , (13 March 2013)

See also
 List of K-pop artists

References

External links
  
 Official blog 
 Oricon artist profile 

1982 births
Living people
King Records (Japan) artists
21st-century South Korean  male singers